Victoria Hospital for Sick Children is a building in Toronto, Ontario, Canada. The building served as a hospital until 1951 and currently serves as a blood centre. The building has received a Commendation of Adaptive Re-use from the Toronto Historical Board.

History
The hospital was built in 1892 by the architectural firm of Darling and Curry and served as the hospital that is now called Hospital for Sick Children (or "Sick Kids") until 1951. The construction of the five-storey building was a very important step in the history of the hospital since  it was previously located in a small downtown house which was rented for sixteen years by Elizabeth McMaster, the founder of the hospital, with support from a group of Toronto women (Toronto Archives). The invention of pablum, the introduction of incorporated X-rays in 1896, and the origins of the battle for compulsory milk pasteurization in 1908 occurred in this building (Adams 206).

Since 1993, it has been home to Canadian Red Cross Regional Blood Centre and later the Canadian Blood Services Regional Blood Centre. It is located at the corner of College and Elizabeth Streets, near the Toronto General Hospital.

Architecture
The building, which is made of sandstone, is rendered in the Richardsonian Romanesque style, then a trend in the design of buildings. Thick masonry walls are used as structure, with heavily rusticated stone used at the base. There is a cavernous door opening and windows are set deeply in reveals. The roof is steeply pitched, proving ventilation to the building (Adams 206).

Awards
The building was awarded with Commendation of Adaptive Reuse by the Toronto Historical Board after it was reconstructed in 1993 by Parkin Architects (Official Parkin).

See also
 List of oldest buildings and structures in Toronto

References

 Adams, Annmarie. Medicine by Design: the Architect and the Modern Hospital, 1893-1943. Minneapolis: University of Minnesota, 2008. Print. 
 Crossman, Kelly. Architecture in Transition: from Art to Practice, 1885-1906. Kingston [Ont.: McGill-Queens UP, 1987. Print.
 The Hospital for Sick Children (SickKids). "About Sick Kids." SickKids. The Hospital for Sick Children (SickKids). Web. 15 Oct. 2010. . 
 Parkin Architects. "Canadian Blood Services Renovation." Parkin Architects Limited. Parkin Architects Limited. Web. 16 Oct. 2010. . 
 Toronto Archives. "1892, Opening of the Hospital for Sick Children." Toronto. City of Toronto. Web. 15 Oct. 2010. . 
 Canadian Red Cross Regional Blood Centre
 Lost Rivers - Hospitals for Sick Children
 SickKids History
 Victoria Hospital for Sick Children

Hospital buildings completed in 1892
Hospitals in Toronto
Hospitals established in 1892
1892 establishments in Ontario
Defunct hospitals in Canada